Newport Township is a township in Lake County, Illinois, USA.  As of the 2010 census, its population was 6,770. It includes most parts of the villages of Old Mill Creek and Wadsworth, as well as smaller portions of the villages of Antioch, Beach Park, and a corner of the city of Waukegan. The unincorporated communities of Rosecrans and Russell are also within the township, and the unincorporated community of Millburn is also located partially within Newport Township.

Geography
Lakes in this township include Sterling Lake. The streams of Mill Creek, North Mill Creek and Pettibone Creek run through this township.

Cities and towns
 Old Mill Creek (northeast three-quarters)
 Wadsworth (majority)
 Waukegan (partial)
 Zion (partial)

Adjacent townships
 Benton Township (east)
 Zion Township (east)
 Waukegan Township (southeast)
 Warren Township (south)
 Antioch Township (west)
 Lake Villa Township (west)

Cemeteries
The township contains four cemeteries: Millburn, Mount Rest, Oakdale and Saint Patricks.

Major highways

Airports and landing strips
 Herbert C Maas Airport

Demographics

Education

Gurnee School District 56
The schools in the district include:

Public elementary/middle schools
 Spaulding Elementary School, Gurnee, grades PK-2
 O Plaine Intermediate School, Gurnee, grades 3-5
 Viking Middle School, Gurnee, grades 6-8
 Woodland Elementary School, Gurnee K-3
 Woodland Intermediate School, Gurnee, grades 4-5
 Woodland Middle School, Gurnee, grades 6-8
 Gurnee Grade School, Gurnee, grades K-8

Public high school
 Warren Township High School, Gurnee, grades 9-12

Private elementary/middle schools
 S Da Christian School of Lake County, grades KG-8

Antioch Community Consolidated School District 34
The schools in the district include:

Public elementary schools
 Hillcrest Elementary School, Antioch, grades PK-2
 Antioch Elementary School, Antioch, grades 2-5
 Oakland Elementary School, Antioch, grades 2-5
 W C Petty Elementary School, Antioch, grades 2-5
 Emmons Grade School, Antioch, grades K-8
 Grass Lake Grade School, Antioch, grades PK-8

Public middle school
 Antioch Middle School, Antioch, grades 6-8

Public high school
 Antioch Community High School, Antioch, grades 9-12

Private elementary/middle schools
 St Peter Catholic School, Antioch, grades KG-8
 Faith Evangelical Lutheran School, Antioch, grades PK-8

Beach Park Community Consolidated School District 3
The schools in the district include:

Public elementary schools:
 Howe Elementary School, Beach Park, grades K-5
 Kenneth Murphy Elementary School, Beach Park, grades K-5
 Newport Elementary School, Wadsworth, grades K-5
 Oak Crest Elementary School, Zion, grades K-5

Public middle school:
 Beach Park Middle School, Beach Park, grades 6-8

Millburn Community Consolidated School District 24
The schools in the district include:

 Millburn Elementary School (formerly Millburn Central), Wadsworth, grades K-5
 Millburn Middle School (formerly Millburn West), Lindenhurst, grades 6-8

Economy

References
 U.S. Board on Geographic Names (GNIS)
 United States Census Bureau cartographic boundary files

External links
 Newport Township official website
 US-Counties.com
 City-Data.com
 US Census
 Illinois State Archives

Townships in Lake County, Illinois
Townships in Illinois